Myra Edith Keaton (née Cutler; March 13, 1877 – July 21, 1955) was an American vaudeville performer and film actress. She was the mother of actor Buster Keaton.

Early life and career
Myra Keaton was born on March 13, 1877, in Modale, Iowa, the daughter of Frank Cutler and Sarah Elizabeth (née Shaffer). She had an older brother, Burt Melvin Cutler, and two younger half-brothers, Clinton M. Cutler and Marine (Mel) Cutler.

As teenagers, Myra and Burt traveled and performed with their father's medicine show. Joe Keaton joined the show while they traveled through Oklahoma Territory in 1893. Myra and Joe married on May 31, 1894, and began performing together in various medicine shows and vaudeville. Their children were actor Buster Keaton (né Joseph Frank Keaton), Harry Keaton and Louise Keaton. At the age of four, Buster officially joined the family's vaudeville act, which was billed as "The Three Keatons". Myra and Buster left the act in 1917, as a result of problems arising from Joe Keaton's drinking.

All members of the Keaton family occasionally appeared in Buster's silent and sound comedies. Although estranged in later years, Myra remained married to Joe until Joe's death in 1946.

Death
Keaton died on July 21, 1955, in Los Angeles, California, aged 78. She is buried at Glen Haven Memorial Park in Sylmar, California.

References

External links

 Keaton biography
 

Actresses from Iowa
American film actresses
American silent film actresses
People from Harrison County, Iowa
Actresses from Los Angeles
Vaudeville performers
1877 births
1955 deaths
20th-century American actresses